The 2020–21 NWFL Premiership  was the 31st season of Nigeria women's top-flight association football league and the first since its renaming. The season began December 9, 2020.

This season saw 14 teams competing as the number of clubs were expanded from 12. 
Adamawa Queens, Ibom Angels and Heartland Queens failed to meet the deadline for club licensing and registration and where subsequently relegated to the NWFL Championship. They were replaced by Dream Stars Ladies and Osun Babes who were initially relegated from the 2019 season.
Pro-league champions Olori Babes, were promoted and renamed Royal Queens, Pelican Stars were also promoted from the Pro-league.

On 25 April 2021, Rivers Angels won the Super Six tournament, clinching their 7th title and qualifying for the maiden CAF Women's Champions League.  Subsequently, on 11 May, Ibom Angels and DreamStar Ladies were confirmed relegated, the later eliminated on goal difference.

Format 
This season saw a return to the straight table format without the clubs divided into groups since the 2014 season. All 14 teams were to play each other home and away to decide the league champions. 

On 5 April, the NWFL board and the 14 clubs participating in the league agreed that the top six clubs at the end of the first round would play in a "Super Six" series to determine the league champions, while the bottom four clubs at the end of the same period would battle for survival in a play-off, with the last two teams at the end of the series relegated. The decision was taken due to the inaugural CAF Women's Champions League due to begin in May, so as to enter the country's representatives.

Clubs

Regular season

Playoffs

Championship playoffs
The top six teams at the end of the regular season engaged each other in a round-robin playoff between 19 to 25 April in order to decide the league champion and representative at the maiden CAF Women's Champions League. All matches were played at the Dipo Dina International Stadium in Ijebu-Ode.

Relegation playoffs
The bottom four teams at the end of the regular season engaged each other in a round-robin playoff between 8 to 11 May to decide the last two clubs to be relegated. All matches were played at the University of Benin Sports Complex in Benin City.

Statistical leaders

Top scorers
This does not include playoffs.

Hat-tricks

Individual awards

Monthly awards

References

External links
 
NWFL Premiership 2020/21 at RSSF

NWFL Premiership seasons
N
Women